Broad Street National Bank is located in Trenton, Mercer County, New Jersey, United States. The building was built in 1900 and added to the National Register of Historic Places on January 17, 2008.

See also
National Register of Historic Places listings in Mercer County, New Jersey

References

Commercial buildings on the National Register of Historic Places in New Jersey
Commercial buildings completed in 1900
Buildings and structures in Trenton, New Jersey
National Register of Historic Places in Trenton, New Jersey
New Jersey Register of Historic Places
Skyscrapers in New Jersey
Skyscraper office buildings in New Jersey